Transportation safety in the United States encompasses safety of transportation in the United States, including automobile crashes, airplane crashes, rail crashes, and other mass transit incidents, although the most fatalities are generated by road incidents yearly killing from 32,479 to nearly 38,680 (+%) in the last decade.
The number of deaths per passenger-mile on commercial airlines in the United States between 2000 and 2010 was about 0.2 deaths per 10 billion passenger-miles. For driving, the rate was 150 per 10 billion vehicle-miles: 750 times higher per mile than for flying in a commercial airplane.

The U.S. government's National Center for Health Statistics reported 33,736 motor vehicle traffic deaths in 2014. This exceeded the number of firearm deaths, which was 33,599 in 2014. According to another U.S. government office, the National Highway Traffic Safety Administration (NHTSA), motor vehicle crashes on U.S. roadways claimed 32,744 lives in 2014 and 35,092 in 2015. (The National Center for Health Statistics may have different criteria for inclusion or a slightly different methodology from the National Highway Traffic Safety Administration.) The National Highway Traffic Safety Administration report comparing 2015 to 2014 said that fatalities increased from 2014 to 2015 in almost all categories: passenger vehicle occupants, passengers of large trucks, pedestrians, cyclists, motorcyclists, male and female, daytime and nighttime driving, and alcohol-impaired driving. Fatalities of drivers of large trucks remained unchanged. A NHTSA regression analysis of monthly roadway fatalities and various possible explanatory variables over the five-year period 2011–2015 showed the strongest correlation was with vehicle miles traveled (VMT), which had a correlation of .80, followed by average monthly temperature, which had a correlation of .74, meaning that higher temperatures were associated with increased fatalities. Part of the reason for that pattern may be that more people are out walking and biking in the warmer months, and pedestrians and cyclists are often victims of collisions with motor vehicles. The report also suggests that there may be more vacation travel during warmer months. The report does not say if the analysis was based on annual vehicle miles traveled or monthly vehicle miles traveled. Although not mentioned, motorcycle use, and therefore motorcyclist fatalities, may also increase in warmer months.

The National Safety Council (NSC), a nonprofit safety advocacy group, estimates U.S. motor vehicle deaths in 2016 were 40,200, a 14% increase from its 2014 estimate. NSC counts traffic and non-traffic deaths within one year of a crash while the  U.S. government agencies count only traffic deaths occurring within 30 days of a crash. NSC statistics show that the increase in 2016 was due only in part to increased miles driven resulting from population growth, low fuel prices, and a strengthening economy. NSC said the increase in deaths not explained by increased vehicle miles can be attributed to complacency about impaired driving and increased driver distraction.

In 2020, fatalities increased to nearly 38,680 due to fewer people driving on the road (13% less distance) and more risky behavior, including speeding, failing to wear seat belts, and driving under the influence of drugs or alcohol.

Motor vehicle deaths are most often expressed as a rate, often deaths per 100 million vehicle-miles or per billion vehicle-miles, or, for international comparisons, as deaths per billion vehicle-kilometers.

Introduction

In the United States, most fatalities are generated by road vehicles.

Safety overall has steadily improved in the United States for many decades. Between 1920 and 2000, the rate of fatal automobile crashes per vehicle-mile decreased by a factor of about 17. Except for a pause during the youth bulge of the 1960s (a time when many young, inexperienced drivers were on the road), progress in reducing fatal crashes has been steady. Safety for other types of U.S. passenger transportation has also improved substantially, but long-term statistical data are not as readily available. While the fatality rate roughly leveled off around 2000–2005 at around 1.5 fatalities per 100 million miles traveled, it has resumed a downward trend and reached 1.27 in 2008. The National Safety Council, using methodology that differs from the NHTSA, reports a rate (including deaths of pedestrians and cyclists killed in motor vehicle crashes) of 1.25 deaths per 100 million vehicle miles (or 12.5 deaths per billion vehicle miles) traveled in 2016.

Between 2008 and 2011, the economic recession, by a  reduction in distance traveled, contributed to reducing fatalities.

Traffic safety by mode by traveled distance (public transportation)

Federal and individual approaches

The United States is exceptional in the way it approaches transportation safety.

While aviation is considered at a federal level with the FAA, road safety lacks a strong, federally led approach. Road safety is considered by each of the states of the US.

American attitudes regarding government surveillance and privacy, constitutionally guaranteed rights to confront one's accuser in criminal prosecutions, and skepticism towards government power might also have a role in concerns about transportation safety in the United States.

Four basic traits identified by Tocqueville in the 1830s have some influence on transportation safety in the United States:
 Individualism (personal and private initiative);
 Anti-statism (skepticism of government authority);
 Populism (wisdom and power of the common person); and
 Egalitarianism (equality of opportunity).

Automated camera technology might be used as in other nations to enforce traffic violations, but some argues that it violates the Constitution's Sixth Amendment, which provides that in “all criminal prosecutions, the accused shall enjoy the right … to be confronted with the witnesses against him.”.

Some people in government want to say that safety is priority number one, but when the federal government provides some guidances for safety measure which would reduce death by 37%, such as alcohol in 1998 or motorcycle helmet in 1967, around ten years are necessary for such measures be implemented by a number of local governments.

Federal organizations
Several federal organizations deal with transportation safety in the United States:
 The National Transportation Safety Board (NTSB) investigates accidents and makes recommendations to the regulatory agencies.
 Highway safety in general and vehicle safety in particular is the responsibility of the DOT's National Highway Traffic Safety Administration (NHTSA).
 Design standards for safe highways are the responsibility of the Federal Highway Administration.
 Safety standards for commercial motor carriers and motor vehicle operators are the responsibility of the Federal Motor Carrier Safety Administration (FMCSA).
 Railroad safety is the province of the Federal Railroad Administration.
 Aviation safety is the responsibility of the Federal Aviation Administration (FAA);
 The Federal Transit Administration has assumed responsibility for federal oversight of transit agency safety.
 Pipeline safety is the responsibility of the Pipeline and Hazardous Materials Safety Administration (PHMSA).
 Safe transportation of hazardous materials is the responsibility of PHMSA.
 Marine safety is the responsibility of the U.S. Coast Guard within the Department of Homeland Security.
 Offshore pipeline safety is the responsibility of the Bureau of Safety and Environmental Enforcement within the Department of the Interior.
 Workplace safety, including the safety of transportation workers, is the responsibility of the Occupational Safety and Health Administration within the Department of Labor.
 Transport of hazardous waste is generally subject to regulation by PHMSA, but is subject to additional regulation by the Environmental Protection Agency.
 The Nuclear Regulatory Commission sets standards for the design and manufacture of packages containing radioactive materials, while PHMSA regulates actual transport of the materials.

Local organizations
New York City started a program, Vision Zero, that aims to lower vehicular fatalities by 50% between 2014 and 2025.

United States compared to other nations

The US ranks 41 out of 52 high-income nations based on road traffic deaths. US safety results are better than Russia, Saudi Arabia or Qatar.
Nonetheless the fatality rate in the United States is high relative to most other high-income nations. The 2013 U.S. rate of 7.1 road fatalities per 1 billion vehicle-km is about double the 2013 rate in Sweden, which was 3.5 road fatalities per 1 billion vehicle-km. (See: List of countries by traffic-related death rate.)
Also, United States is considered as "the most dangerous of wealthy nations for a child to be born into".

This differences might be linked to a difference of approach in driving safety culture, for instance in the balance between liberty and mandatory or forbidden dangerous or unsafe behavior.

To some extent this is due to geography and driver training, but more rigorous impaired driving enforcement and severe penalties in Sweden for driving under the influence may also explain the difference. While it might be argued that highways and vehicles in Sweden are different from those in the United States, the U.S. fatality rate is also about double the rate in the Canadian province of Ontario, which experienced 3.6 road fatalities per 1 billion vehicle-km according to preliminary 2014 data. Ontario, which is a vast province of more than 1 million square kilometers, has a similar mix of highway types including congested urban and rural highways. Ontario also has a similar mix of large transport trucks essentially identical to U.S. transport trucks, full-sized pickup trucks, SUVs and passenger cars, although there may be more small cars driven in Ontario compared to the United States. This suggests that differences in fatality rates are due to non-physical factors such as driver behavior.

Comparing motorways (controlled-access, divided highways) in Europe and the United States, according to 2012 data, Denmark had the safest motorways with a rate of 0.72 road fatalities per 1 billion vehicle-km, while the United States had 3.38 road fatalities per 1 billion vehicle-km on its Interstate-type highways, often called freeways.

In Germany the death rate on such highways was 1.74 road fatalities per 1 billion vehicle-km, about half the U.S. rate for Interstate-type highways. See: Safety: international comparison.
In Germany significant sections to the Autobahn network do not have mandatory speed limits, when according to the  German Road Safety Council (DVR) the number of deaths per kilometer of motorway is 30% lower when motorways have speed limit.

Another difference between the US and Europe is that Europeans believe higher speed limits have an adverse impact on safety. For instance, in 2008 an ETSC report considers that «empirical evidence indicates that all instances of introduced speed limits on German motorways have caused very large casualty reductions.». According to the ETSC, in Germany, fatalities per kilometer of motorway is not linked to speed limit, but speed limit sections allows higher traffic volumes for a similar number of fatalities. That means that fatalities per traveled distance is lower where there are speed limits.

Road safety compared to European union nations

Until the 1980s, the US had lower road death rates than European countries. Most European countries have consistently improved their road safety since then, and now have lower rates than the US.

In 2020, fatalities increased to nearly 38,680 in the US due to fewer people driving on the road.
The same year, fatalities decreased to 18,800 in the EU, due to fewer people driving on the road.
That year there was % more fatalities in the US than in the EU, or % less in the EU than in the US.

Road safety compared to other UNECE nations by population

With 114 fatalities per million inhabitants in 2017, the United States has a lower fatality rate than Kyrgyzstan (147 per million inhabitants), Georgia (139 per million inhabitants) and Kazakhstan (115 per million inhabitants).

Safety compared to other nations by traveled distance

Traffic safety compared to other nations by traveled distance

Train safety compared to other nations by traveled distance

Compared to Canada

US trend is less favorable for the US than for Canada due to various factors such as vehicle, speed camera, transit, gasoline price and traveled distance.

Road safety
Car accidents are very common in the United States and the majority of these road crashes are caused by human error.

The target for the United States is to reduce fatalities rate at 1.02 fatalities per 100 million vehicles miles traveled in 2014.

The target for the United States is to reduce fatalities rate at 1.02 fatalities per 100 million vehicles miles traveled in 2018.

In 2018, there was 33,654 fatalities in the 50 states and the District of Columbia, and 295 in Puerto Rico (total: 33,949).

Road to Zero

Road to Zero is a Vision zero initiative which aim to reach zero fatalities by 2050.

Rural vs Urban

In the US, in 2016, there were 18590 rural fatalities for 17656 urban fatalities.
Taking into account traveled miles, there was a risk of 1.96 fatalities per 100 million traveled miles on rural roads, for a risk of 0.79 fatalities per 100 million traveled miles on urban roads.

This makes 48% of people killed in urban area, for 52% of people killed in rural area.

In 2018, the increase in urban fatalities changed this rate: there was 16410 rural fatalities for 19499 urban fatalities, and 651 unlocated fatalilites. This makes 53% of people killed in urban area, for 45% of people killed in rural area.

In other countries, the rate are:
 44% killed in urban area (speed limit lower than 60 km/h) in Canada in 2016, for 66% killed on rural area (speed limit upper than 60 km/h)
 37% killed on urban streets (speed limit usually lower than 50 km/h, except in Poland) in the European union in 2015, for 8% on motorways and 55% on rural non motorways roads (speed limit usually upper than 50 km/h).

During the 2010–2019 decade,
 rural roads became safer from 18,089 fatalities in 2010 to 16,340 one in 2019 for a same traveled distance;
 urban roadway deaths increased by 34 percent while urban distance traveled increased 15 percent:
 pedestrian fatalities increased by 62%,
 cyclist fatalities increased by 49%.

Fatality rates by state
As of 2019, Mississippi and Alabama lead the rate of motor vehicle deaths in the US by state with 25.2 and 20.6 deaths respectively per 100,000 population. The death rate per 100 million miles traveled in 2015 ranged from 0.52 in Massachusetts to 1.89 in South Carolina. (The Massachusetts rate translates to about 3.25 fatalities per 1 billion vehicle-km. The South Carolina rate translates to about 11.8 fatalities per 1 billion vehicle-km.) In South Carolina, North Dakota and Texas, more than 40% of road fatalities were attributed to driving under the influence (DUI). A plot of vehicle-miles traveled per capita vs fatalities per 100,000 population shows Montana, South Carolina and West Virginia as outliers with higher than expected fatalities.
Enforcement and compliance with seat belt laws varies by state. (Massachusetts, which had the lowest death rate per 100 million miles traveled in 2015, was among the states with the lowest use of seat belts.) Some states require motorcycle helmets while others do not, and the states of Illinois, Iowa and New Hampshire have no helmet laws at all. Speed limits, traffic density, topography, climate and many other factors affect the divergent accident rates by state. Speed limits in Texas, Utah, and Rhode Island are prima facie rather than absolute. This allows motorists in those states to defend against a speeding charge if it can be proven that the speed was reasonable and prudent. In good driving conditions, many drivers in prima facie states presume (usually correctly) that police will allow some tolerance in enforcement. Even in states with absolute speed limits, enforcement and penalties vary from one state to another. For these and other reasons, state-to-state comparisons are difficult. There are many studies examining increases in Interstate speed limits from 55 mph to 65, 70 and 75 mph. Some found that fatality rates increased significantly on Interstate highways where speed limits were raised. One study that examined the change from 55 to 65 mph found higher Interstate speed limits improved overall highway safety by drawing traffic from less safe secondary highways to safer Interstate highways. Since the changes to 80 mph speed limits in some states (and 85 mph on one section of a toll highway in Texas) are relatively recent, robust analysis is not yet available. Anecdotal evidence suggests actual vehicle speeds did not increase as much as speed limits did. Also, police may be enforcing the new higher limits more strictly than they enforced the prior limits. In some states, police have reallocated resources to focus more on impaired and distracted driving. The higher speed limits are predominantly in rural states, which tend to be Republican states. To many Republican voters, speed limits (and seat belt laws) are seen as intrusions on personal liberty. According to transportation historian Owen Gutfreund, state governments may raise speed limits because raising the speed limit “sounds like such an easy regulatory win.” It's a simple way to “get government out of your face.”

On the other hand, according to iihs, Farmer performed a new study comparing deaths per billion miles traveled  by  state  and  roadway  type — between 1993 and 2013 — on rural roads (the study does not cover the urban roads) concluded that each 5 mph (8 km/h) increase in the maximum speed limit is related to a  4  percent  fatalities increase on some roads and an 8 percent increase on  interstates  and  freeways.
Anyway such effect and safer cars mitigate together.

By class of road users

Class of road user involved in crash death vary from state to state. Anyway, in 2016, amongst many US states, Wyoming has a higher percentage of deaths involving occupants of SUVs and pickups, Massachusetts has highest proportions of car occupant deaths,  District of Columbia has the highest percentage of motorcyclist deaths.
The District of Columbia and New York have the highest percentage of pedestrian deaths.

Although the number of motorcyclist death is lower than car's one, it is greater by traveled distance (miles or kilometers).

Pedestrians and cyclists

As cars have become safer for occupants (due to airbags, structural crashworthiness and other improvements) the percent of pedestrian fatalities as a percent of total motor vehicle fatalities steadily increased from 11% in 2004 to 15% in 2014 according to NHTSA data. Bicyclists accounted for 2 percent of all traffic deaths in 2014.

Large trucks

According to the IIHS rear crash safety of large trucks could be improved by 44% with forward collision warning systems 
and by 41% with automatic emergency braking.

In the US, Automated emergency braking (AEB) is not mandatory for heavy vehicles while it is in the European Union.

Rates per driver's license
One can also calculate auto fatalities per driver's license. From 1990 to 2009, this number has also been improving: from 1 death per 3,745 driver's licenses in 1990 to 1 per 6,200 driver's licenses in 2009. Crowded, traffic-choked Northeastern cities including Washington, D.C., Baltimore, Boston, Providence, Philadelphia, Newark, Hartford, New Haven, Springfield and Worcester, Massachusetts, were most likely to have car accidents. The NHTSA through its Fatality Analysis Reporting System stated that auto fatalities continue to be the leading cause of death for young adults.

Risk factors

Rural non-Interstate highways are particularly risky. Most are two-lane non-divided highways built to lower standards than Interstate highways. Drivers are more likely to be drunk or not wearing seat belts. Speeding is common. Deer, elk and moose crossing the highway add to the risk compared to urban highways. In the event of an accident in a remote area, injured victims may not receive emergency medical care in time to save their lives.

Many accidents when driving personal vehicles are caused by distracted driving. According to the American Automobile Association (AAA), distraction plays a factor in 60% of moderate to serious teen car crashes. Specifically, passenger and cell phone interaction accounted for 27% of crashes, the leading cause. Drivers looking away from the target (roadway) also accounted for 19%.

Non-use of seat belts is a significant risk factor. According to Col. Tom Butler, chief of the Montana Highway Patrol, preliminary 2015 data indicated that 178 of the 224 vehicle occupant fatalities were of individuals not wearing seat belts. The fine in Montana for not wearing a seat belt in 2015 was $20. Although speed limits increased from 75 mph to 80 mph on rural interstates that year, the biggest statewide increase in both crashes and deaths occurred on secondary roads. Forty-three people died on Montana two-lane roads outside of towns that are neither U.S. or state highways.

Average trip duration may be greater in rural states, which may mean driver fatigue is a more salient risk factor in rural states than in more densely populated states. Most data on the number of hours driven in a day and accident rates is for commercial drivers who are required to keep driving logs. (See next section.)

Human factor is one of the more significant in various factors leading to fatalities.

With the increase in the volume of American cars, the number of deaths of drivers and passengers inside these rolling castles has decreased by 22%. But the number of pedestrians has increased by 57%. If Americans had stuck to smaller vehicles, 8,000 pedestrian lives would have been saved between 2000 and 2018, estimates Justin Tyndall, assistant professor of economics at the University of Hawaii.

According to FDOT:
 «When speeding is compared to fault,  drivers traveling at any speed over 4  MPH over the posted limit were highly overrepresented in fault. As the amount of speeding increases,  the degree of overrepresentation increases;  however,  even at 5–9 miles over the limit,  drivers were overrepresented in fault by a  factor of over 2.0. ».
 «drinking drivers were between 3.5 and 18 times as likely to be at fault in the crash, depending on the amount of alcohol ingested.  »

Cause
Several causes are involved:

Age

Calendar factors

The five most fatal days count more the 115 yearly fatalities making at least 575 fatalities in a five years period.

 July 4 is the Independence Day (United States). On that day, in the US, fatalities are 25% higher than a regular day, each year.
 November 1
 August 2
 October 25
 August 30

Saturday is not a labour day. On that day, in the US, fatalities are 20% higher than a regular day, each year.

Vehicle Miles Traveled (VMT)

It is sometimes understood that fatalities increase with the increase of VMT, but this is not systematic as fatalities might remain quite stable while the VMT change.

Modal comparison
When Motor Vehicle Fatalities are compared to Fatalities occurring using mass transit in the U.S., the difference is enormous. According to the cited study, there are more than 30,000 deaths each year in the U.S. on public roads. For all types of mass transit there are less than 150 fatalities each year.

Driving versus flying

The number of deaths per passenger-mile on commercial airlines in the United States between 2000 and 2010 was about 0.2 deaths per 10 billion passenger-miles,
while for driving, the rate was 1.5 per 100 million vehicle-miles for 2000, which is 150 deaths per 10 billion miles for comparison with the air travel rate.

The per mile risk for vehicle transportation is therefore 750 times higher than the per mile risk for commercial air travel.

The greatest risk in flying is in takeoff and landing, meaning that longer aircraft trips are safer per mile. Commuter planes used on shorter flights have higher risk than larger jet aircraft. Driving on U.S. Interstate highways, which are almost always controlled-access divided highways, is safer than driving on most other roads and highways.

Unlike the large U.S. air carriers and commuter airlines, which on average have less than 20 fatalities annually, each year general aviation fatalities number in the hundreds. Most general aviation accidents involve single-engine, piston-powered airplanes used in recreational aviation.

Aviation vs rail

Rail and bus

Rail and bus (motorcoach) accidents also account for fatalities, although public transportation is far less dangerous than driving a personal vehicle.

From 2014 to 2016, fatal rail fatalities were 227, 234 and 231; with trespassers, fatalities are 749 for 2016.

Transportation jobs: Commercial drivers and air pilots

Driver fatigue is a concern, particularly for commercial drivers. Hours of service regulations are issued by the Federal Motor Carrier Safety Administration (FMCSA) and govern the working hours of anyone operating a commercial motor vehicle (CMV) in the United States. The relationship between number of hours driven and the percent of commercial truck crashes related to driver fatigue is an exponential relationship. (See graph.)

Although the accident rate per 100 million miles for professional truckers is low, the high number of miles driven by a truck driver makes truck driving a risky occupation. Trucking transportation occupations accounted for one quarter of all work-related fatalities in 2015, more than any other U.S. job, according to the U.S. Labor Department's Bureau of Labor Statistics' annual workplace fatality report. The fatal injury rate in 2015 was 14.7 per 100,000 full-time equivalent workers in transportation and material moving occupations (which includes both truckers and air transportation workers.) This was a significantly lower rate than for workers in farming, fishing, and forestry occupations, but high compared to most other occupation categories. The report did not break out the fatal injury rate per 100,000 full-time equivalent workers among aircraft pilots and flight engineers but did note that they had a high fatal injury rate compared to all workers. There were 57 fatalities among aircraft pilots and flight engineers in 2015.

Safety by state

Between 2006 and 2015, number of killed people changed from 42642 to 35092 (−17%). During this period, around half of the states reduced the number of death by more than 20%, for instance: Alabama, Arizona, Arkansas, California, District of Columbia, Hawaii, Illinois, Iowa, Kansas, Louisiana, Maryland, Massachusetts, Mississippi, Nevada, New Jersey, New Mexico, New York, Oklahoma, Pennsylvania, Rhode Island, South Dakota, Tennessee, Vermont, Virginia, West Virginia, Wisconsin, Wyoming.

In the same time, some states have killed more people, for instance North Dakota and Texas.

Road safety states trends

NTSB most Wanted List are on roadway safety

NTSB chair considers a change is needed because 

The five NTSB’s Most Wanted List to prevent accidents, reduce injuries, and save lives are:
    Implement a Comprehensive Strategy to Eliminate Speeding-Related Crashes
    Protect Vulnerable Road Users through a Safe System Approach
    Prevent Alcohol- and Other Drug-Impaired Driving
    Require Collision-Avoidance and Connected-Vehicle Technologies on all Vehicles
    Eliminate Distracted Driving (Distracted driving)

See also
 List of motorcycle deaths in U.S. by year
 Alcohol-related traffic crashes in the United States
 List of motor vehicle deaths in U.S. by year
 Road safety
 Air safety
 Risk analysis
 Rail Safety Improvement Act of 2008
 Work-related road safety in the United States
 Traffic code in the United States

Notes

References
 

Transport safety
Transportation in the United States